Brass Monkey is a 1948 British comedy thriller with musical asides, directed by Thornton Freeland. It stars Carroll Levis, a radio variety show host and talent scout (known as "Britain's favourite Canadian") and American actress Carole Landis in her last film. Also known as The Lucky Mascot, the film features an early appearance by comic actor Terry-Thomas, playing himself.

Though made in 1948, Brass Monkey wasn't released in the US until 1951.

Plot
Popular radio presenter Carroll Levis (playing himself), and Kay Sheldon (Carole Landis) find themselves entangled in a web of smuggling and murder. When a priceless "brass monkey" is stolen from a Japanese temple and smuggled into England, Levis encounters the eccentric Mr. Ryder-Harris (Ernest Thesiger), a Buddhist art connoisseur who's chasing the artefact, and will apparently stop at nothing to get it. The monkey is missing and suspicious murders are being committed in the hunt for its retrieval. With the help of the Discoveries radio talent, Levis attempts to avoid murderous henchman Herbert Lom, and foil Mr. Ryder-Harris's plans. Amongst all the mayhem, an array of musical and comedy performers audition for and appear on The Levis Hour, the hero's weekly radio programme.

Cast
 Carroll Levis as himself 
 Carole Landis as Kay Sheldon 
 Herbert Lom as Peter Hobart 
 Avril Angers as herself 
 Ernest Thesiger as Ryder-Harris 
 Edward Underdown as Max Taylor 
 Henry Edwards as Inspector Miller 
 Henry Worthington as Rodney 
 Terry-Thomas as himself
 Leslie 'Hutch' Hutchinson as Hutch
 Campbell Cotts as A.J. Gilroy
 Peter Williams as Detective Fellows

Production
Landis arrived in England to make the film in August 1947. Landis says she encouraged English actors to speak slower so US audiences could understand them.

Songs
"It's the Greatest Business in the world" by Gaby Rogers – staged by Buddy Bradley
"Home Sweet Home" by Sid Colin and Steve Race
"Somebody Blew My Bluebird's Egg" by Noel Langley and Pat Quin
"I Know Myself Too Well" by Ross Parker
"Tomorrow's Rainbow" by Colin Campbell

Critical reception
 Time Out called the film a "ramshackle support feature", and concluded it was "a curio, but not really a collectible."
In a contemporary review, The Geraldton Guardian called The Brass Monkey, a "well told story."
 Sky Movies wrote, "a rough (very rough) and tumble British comedy-thriller spun round the then popular shows featuring Carroll Levis. ... Not much as a film ... But of undoubted interest for its extraordinary cast."

References

External links
 
 

1948 films
British black-and-white films
British crime thriller films
Films directed by Thornton Freeland
1940s crime thriller films
1940s crime comedy films
British crime comedy films
1948 comedy films
1940s English-language films
1940s British films